The Boulder Hills,  el. , is a set of foothills north of Boulder, Montana in Jefferson County, Montana.

See also
 List of mountain ranges in Montana

Notes

Mountain ranges of Montana
Landforms of Jefferson County, Montana